Ronald David Moore (born 29 January 1953) is an English football manager and former player. He has taken charge of several clubs including Rotherham United, Tranmere Rovers and Hartlepool United.

He played for many different clubs in a career spanning almost two decades, including Tranmere Rovers, Cardiff City, Charlton Athletic and Rotherham United. He is widely considered to be one of the greatest Rotherham players of all time. Beginning his career in management at Southport in 1997, he went on to manage Rotherham, guiding them to two successive promotions from Division Three to Division One. He moved to Oldham Athletic in 2005, before becoming manager of former club Tranmere Rovers one year later. He returned to Rotherham for a second time in 2009, before returning to Tranmere Rovers for a second time in 2012. In February 2014 he was suspended by the club, pending the outcome of a Football Association investigation into alleged breaches of betting rules; he later admitted breaches of the rules, and was sacked by Tranmere in April 2014. In December 2014, Moore was announced as the new manager of Hartlepool United, but left in 2016.

Managerial career
After several years at Rotherham, Moore joined Oldham Athletic in March 2005, helping the club to avoid relegation. In his second season, he led Oldham to a mid-table finish and won the League One Manager of the Month Award for December 2005, but later parted company with Oldham ostensibly due to poor season ticket sales.

Tranmere Rovers
Moore was immediately offered a position as manager of former club Tranmere Rovers in June 2006, which he accepted. He began his time in charge of Tranmere by bringing in nine players in the close season, including Chris Shuker and Paul McLaren. In his first year, he guided the team finish 9th in League One, although Tranmere had looked likely to achieve a play-off place for most of the year. In his second year in charge, Tranmere could only finish 11th, despite having been top of the table earlier in the season. Moore was affectionately known as "Ronnie Raw" by many Tranmere fans due to his extreme sense of humour.

Return to Rotherham United
In September 2009, Rotherham United confirmed that Moore would begin a second stint as manager, assisted by former teammate Jimmy Mullen. The following day, Ronnie was unveiled to the Millers faithful at the home game against Barnet, to a massive standing ovation. Rotherham went on to win the game 3–0. His return spell at Rotherham was mixed; Moore won the League Two Manager of the Month Award for November 2009, and took the club to Wembley for the League Two Play-Off Final, although the Millers lost 3–2. The 2010–11 season began similarly well, but after a string of indifferent results Moore left the club "by mutual consent" in the wake of a 5–0 defeat to Chesterfield in March, with Rotherham 6th in the table. His failure to secure Rotherham's place in the play-off spots for the second season in succession was largely cited as the reason for his second departure.

Return to Tranmere Rovers
On 5 March 2012, following the sacking of Les Parry, Moore made a second return to a former club, being appointed Tranmere Rovers manager until the end of the season.

On 14 February 2014, it was reported that Moore was under investigation by The Football Association, for breaching its rules against betting on competitions in which his club were involved. Three days later, the club announced that he had been suspended with immediate effect, until the conclusion of the FA investigation. On 31 March, the FA charged Moore in relation to alleged multiple breaches of rules regarding betting on matches. Moore admitted the charge on 8 April, and requested a personal hearing. He was sacked on 9 April 2014; the club said that "Tranmere Rovers will not tolerate any action that damages the integrity of this football club."

Hartlepool United
On 16 December 2014, Moore was appointed as Hartlepool United manager. Moore was appointed with the club bottom of the league, six points from safety and with a goal difference of minus-24. Hartlepool were at one stage ten points adrift at the bottom of the Football League and looked certain for relegation, but Moore inspired a revival in form, with the team having a four-match winning streak towards the latter stages of the season, which eventually ensured league survival in the penultimate game at home to Exeter City. This survival was dubbed the "great escape" by supporters which ironically relegated Moore's former club Tranmere Rovers from the Football League. 

On 10 February 2016, Moore left Hartlepool by mutual consent.

Eastleigh
In August 2016, Moore joined National League side Eastleigh. In Moore's first ten games with the Spitfires, Eastleigh remained unbeaten. In the FA Cup, Moore oversaw a 3–1 victory away at Swindon Town in a replay to reach the second round. On 30 November 2016, Moore decided to leave Eastleigh citing "personal circumstances over the past few weeks". He left the club eight points away from the play-off positions.

Personal life
His son is Ian Thomas-Moore.
He has 2 sons Ian & Scott and 2 Daughters Paula & Charlotte.

Managerial statistics

Honours

Player
Tranmere Rovers
Fourth Division 4th place promotion: 1975–76

Rotherham United
Third Division: 1980–81

Individual
PFA Team of the Year Fourth Division: 1975–76

Manager
Rotherham United
Second Division runner-up: 2000–01
Third Division runner-up: 1999–2000

Individual
League One Manager of the Month: October 2000, December 2005, August 2012, September 2012
League Two Manager of the Month: November 2009

References

External links
Ronnie Moore at Hartlepool United

1953 births
Cardiff City F.C. players
Charlton Athletic F.C. players
Association football forwards
English footballers
English expatriate footballers
English football managers
Living people
Oldham Athletic A.F.C. managers
Rochdale A.F.C. players
Rotherham United F.C. players
Rotherham United F.C. managers
Tranmere Rovers F.C. players
Tranmere Rovers F.C. managers
Hartlepool United F.C. managers
Eastleigh F.C. managers
North American Soccer League (1968–1984) players
Chicago Sting (NASL) players
Southport F.C. managers
Footballers from Liverpool
Expatriate soccer players in the United States
English Football League managers
English expatriate sportspeople in the United States